David William Parker (born 1960) is a New Zealand Labour Party politician who currently serves as Attorney-General, Minister for the Environment, Minister of Oceans and Fisheries,  Minister of Revenue and Associate Minister of Finance in the Sixth Labour Government. He previously served as a Cabinet Minister in the Fifth Labour Government and as interim Leader of the Labour Party from September to November 2014. He represented the Otago electorate at the 47th Parliament and has since served as a list MP.

Before politics
David Parker was born in Roxburgh and grew up in Dunedin. As a teenager, Parker attended Otago Boys' High School. He attended the University of Otago, studying law and business, and co-founded the Dunedin Community Law Centre.

Before entering politics, Parker worked as a litigation partner in the law firm Anderson Lloyd Caudwell. He later had a business career in the agri-biotechnology field, including with Blis Technologies, where he was a manager.

Member of Parliament

Parker first gained election to Parliament as a Labour member in the 2002 election, winning an upset victory over National's Gavan Herlihy in the Otago seat. In the 2005 election, the National candidate Jacqui Dean defeated him in his Otago electorate seat, but he returned to the House due to his position on the Labour list. In the 2008 general election Parker and Dean both stood in the resurrected Waitaki electorate, with Dean winning by over 11,000 votes. Nevertheless, due to his list position he was still returned to parliament.

Fifth Labour Government
During the Fifth Labour Government, Parker served as Attorney-General and Minister of Transport and Energy from 2005 until March 2006. He resigned his position as Attorney-General on 20 March 2006 after an allegation that he had filed an incorrect declaration with the Companies Office on behalf of the property company Queens Park Mews Limited. On 21 March Parker also resigned his place in Cabinet as Minister of Energy, Minister of Transport, and Minister Responsible for Climate Change Issues.
An inquiry by the Companies Office cleared him of the charge of filing false returns.

Helen Clark, the Prime Minister of New Zealand, re-appointed Parker to the Energy and Climate Change portfolios and to the Land Information portfolio on 2 May 2006. (The Attorney-General portfolio remained with Michael Cullen, and Annette King took over Parker's former Transport portfolio.)

In July 2007 Clark appointed Parker as the acting Minister for the Environment following the resignation of David Benson-Pope.

Opposition
Following Labour's defeat in the 2008 general election, Parker became the Opposition spokesperson on Conservation, ACC and Shadow Attorney-General. On 15 June 2010, Opposition Leader Phil Goff appointed Parker to be Portfolio Spokesperson for Economic Development, a position formerly held by Shane Jones, and shifted the portfolio of Conservation to Chris Carter.

Parker ran for the party leadership in 2011, but withdrew part-way through the contest to support David Shearer's bid.

Parker then became the Labour spokesperson for Finance and the shadow Attorney-General (from February 2013).

From 17 September 2013, Parker was the deputy leader of the Labour Party. He retained his finance portfolio.

Following the poor performance of the Labour Party in the 2014 general election, and the eventual resignation of David Cunliffe as leader, Parker was appointed interim leader of the Labour Party. He then unsuccessfully ran in the 2014 Labour Party leadership election and he came third in the leadership election behind Andrew Little and Grant Robertson. Little offered for Parker to continue as finance spokesperson, but Parker declined. Instead, Parker was assigned a range of portfolios including shadow attorney-general and spokesperson for trade and export growth, the environment and, after the resignations of former leaders Goff and Shearer, foreign affairs.

Sixth Labour Government

During the 2017 general election, Parker was re-elected on the Labour Party list. Following the formation of the Labour-led coalition government, he was sworn in as Attorney-General, Minister for Economic Development, Minister for the Environment, and Minister for Trade and Export Growth. He also became Associate Minister of Finance.

In a June 2019 reshuffle, the economic development portfolio was reassigned to Phil Twyford. Prime Minister Jacinda Ardern said this was so that Parker could focus more on water quality and trade negotiations with the European Union and United Kingdom.

As Environment Minister, Parker has launched a "comprehensive overhaul" of the Resource Management Act 1991.

During the 2020 general election, Parker was re-elected on the Labour Party list. On 2 November, he was appointed as Attorney-General, Minister for the Environment, Minister for Oceans and Fisheries, Minister of Revenue and Associate Minister of Finance.

Personal life
On 28 February 2022, Parker became the first New Zealand Member of Parliament to test positive for COVID-19.

References

External links 

 MP biography

|-

|-

|-

|-

|-

|-

|-

1960 births
Living people
Attorneys-General of New Zealand
New Zealand Labour Party MPs
Members of the Cabinet of New Zealand
20th-century New Zealand lawyers
New Zealand list MPs
People from Roxburgh, New Zealand
Members of the New Zealand House of Representatives
New Zealand MPs for South Island electorates
University of Otago alumni
21st-century New Zealand politicians
Candidates in the 2017 New Zealand general election
Candidates in the 2020 New Zealand general election